WRZB-LD, virtual channel 31 (UHF digital channel 32), is a low-powered television station licensed to Washington, D.C., United States. The station is owned by DC Broadcasting, Inc. (which itself is owned by Christopher Blair of Denver, Colorado), and is a sister station to WWTD-LD.

History
WRZB-LD and WWTD-LD both originated in construction permits applied for by Robert Kelly of Annandale, Virginia in 1989 and licensed to Annapolis, Maryland. This station was assigned the callsign W61BY. Kelly applied for extensions annually through 1995, when the fourth extension was denied and the permit was deleted. The permit was reactivated in 2001 and W61BY began airing in October of that year before being taken silent again in 2003.

In 2005, Kelly's Annapolis Broadcasting Company sold both W61BY and W63BP (now sister station WWTD-LD) to Blair's DC Broadcasting, Inc. for $10. The station's callsign was changed to WRZB-LP, and brought a signal back to air on channel 31 from Annapolis in September 2007. Its digital signal moved to the WRC-TV tower in northwest Washington, D.C., and signed on in 2014.

Digital television

Digital channels
The station's digital channel is multiplexed:

References

External links

Television channels and stations established in 2007
Low-power television stations in the United States